Pohang Steelers is a South Korean professional football club based in Pohang, South Korea, who currently play in the K-League. Pohang Steelers' first participation in Asian competition was during the 1996 season, when they competed in the Asian Club Championship, their first match was against PSM Makassar of Indonesia. 

Pohang Steelers have won the Asia Champions League three times. Their most recent participation in the competition was in 2014.

Matches

Record

By season

By competition

References

Pohang Steelers
South Korean football clubs in international competitions